Guiyang railway station is a railway station in Nanming District, Guiyang, Guizhou, China. It is also a stop on Line 1 of the Guiyang Metro.

This station handles all conventional or low-speed passenger trains that serve Guiyang. High-speed trains use Guiyang North and/or Guiyang East.

History
The station was opened in 1959. The station was demolished and rebuilt in 2000, the new building was opened on 30 December.

References

Railway stations in Guizhou
Railway stations in China opened in 1959